The World Trade Centre Kolkata is an under-construction World Trade Center in the Rajarhat New Town, Greater Kolkata in the Indian state of West Bengal. It will consist of twin towers. Upon completion, it will be the tallest World Trade Centre in India. The location is close to Netaji Subhas Chandra Bose International Airport (Kolkata Airport) and Newtown metro station. 

According to highly placed sources, Chief Minister of West Bengal Mamata Banerjee, during the industry enclave meet in Mumbai, was approached by the promoters of World Trade Centre Kolkata with a proposal to erect a similar structure in Kolkata.

References

See also
List of world trade centers
List of tallest buildings in Kolkata
List of tallest buildings in India

Buildings and structures in Kolkata
Economy of Kolkata
Proposed skyscrapers in India